The following ships of the Indian Navy have been named INS Nashak:

Indian Navy ship names